Bay-rum tree sometimes is used as a reference to two plants:
 Myrica, also known as bayberry, from family Myricaceae, used to produce bayberry wax
 Pimenta racemosa, also known as West Indian Bay tree, from family Myrtaceae, used to produce bay rum